This is a list of the tallest structures in Denmark. The list contains all types of structures.
Please expand the list and correct it, where necessary.

References
 Statens Luftfartsvæsen: Air Navigation Obstacles - En Route ||

See also 
 List of tallest buildings in Denmark

External links
 http://skyscraperpage.com/diagrams/?searchID=37729446

Denmark
Tallest